Teversal is a small village in the Ashfield district of Nottinghamshire, England,  west of Mansfield, close to Sutton-in-Ashfield and the boundary with Derbyshire. Former names include Tevershalt, Teversholt, Tyversholtee, Teversale, Tevershall and Teversall.

History

Teversal (called Tevershall) is the site of fictional Wragby Hall, the home of Lady Chatterley in the novel Lady Chatterley's Lover by D. H. Lawrence.

As part of the history of Beauchief Abbey, Sheffield in 1190-1225 William Barry, Lord of Teversal was granted two tofts and crofts in Stanley, a hamlet within the Teversal area. The grant meant that there was sufficient area for a farm. The land now is now Stanley Grange Farm. 
In 1525 Thomas North owned the Grange, where he kept his sheep. In 1537 William Bolles owned the Grange, he was a receiver of the governments dissolved monasteries at the time. Bolles later owned Felley Priory after the priory was dissolved in 1536, as part of King Henry VIII's Dissolution of the Monasteries.

Teversal Manor

Prior to 1562 Roger Greenhalgh owned Teversal Manor. The Manor was then transferred to Francis Molyneux the son in law of Roger in 1582. Francis Molyneux, the High Sheriff of Nottinghamshire between 1582 and 1583 owned Teversal Manor with Francis's grandson John Molyneux being the High Sheriff in 1609. John became the first Baronet of Teversal. The Molyneux baronets and families remained in the village for about 150 years. The Molyneux family were an ancient Norman family.

Teversal Manor was passed to Sir Francis Molyneux, 7th Baronet in (1738-1812). Sir Francis became the Gentleman Usher of the Black Rod. On his death passed the estate of Teversal Manor to Lord Henry Howard-Molyneux-Howard.[41] Lord Henry's eldest daughter was Henrietta Anna Howard-Molyneux-Howard who married Henry Herbert, 3rd Earl of Carnarvon in 1830.

Teversal Manor was passed to Henrietta. The Carnarvons retained the manor which was then passed to the son of the 3rd Earl to Henry Herbert, 4th Earl of Carnarvon, who was a British cabinet minister and Lord Lieutenant of Ireland who married Elizabeth Catherine Howard otherwise known as Elsie. Elsie used the Manor at Teversal for refugees. His son George Herbert, 5th Earl of Carnarvon, and his wife Almina were associated with Howard Carter and funded the excavations of Tutankhamun's tomb in 1922.

Aubrey Herbert, the half Brother of the 5th Earl of Carnarvon, celebrated his coming of age birthday at Teversal Manor. Teversal Manor was visited by the author Virginia Woolf in 1904.

Church

St Katherine's Church, Teversal is a Grade I listed building.

Teversal Trails

The Teversal Trails are a series of paths on the route of old railway lines. The Visitor Centre is located nearby with a car park that serves the football, cricket and bowls clubs. The trails link into the Skegby/Pleasley Trails, with others leading into Silverhill.

See also
Listed buildings in Teversal

References

External links

Villages in Nottinghamshire
Sutton-in-Ashfield